Luther Rice College & Seminary is a private Baptist college and seminary in Lithonia, Georgia. Through the college and seminary the institution offers bachelor's, master's, and doctoral degrees in leadership, counseling, apologetics, Christian worldview, Christian studies, and Christian ministry. The school is recognized as being theologically conservative.

History

Luther Rice College & Seminary was founded in 1962 by Robert Gee Witty in Jacksonville, Florida, and named for Luther Rice, an educator, missionary, and clergyman in the early 1800s. The State of Florida granted the school's charter on June 14, 1962. Dr. Witty was elected President of the college in 1970, a position he held until 1982, when he retired to become Chancellor. In May 1993, Dr. James Flanagan became president of Luther Rice Seminary. He holds an earned Ph.D. from Southwestern Baptist Theological Seminary.

According to the college's website, Steven Steinhilber joined the Luther Rice faculty in 2012, graduated with his M.Div. from Luther Rice in 2015, and became the Executive Vice President in 2016. Steinhilber was appointed the fifth President in July 2021. Steinhilber holds an earned Doctor of Ministry degree from Clamp Divinity School, Anderson University, S.C.

In August 1991, the college moved from Florida to its current location in Metro Atlanta, Georgia.

It has an enrollment of about 1,100 students.

Accreditation

Luther Rice College and Seminary is accredited by the Southern Association of Colleges and Schools and the Association for Biblical Higher Education (ABHE). It is also a member of the Transnational Association of Christian Colleges and Schools (TRACS).

Notable alumni
John Ankerberg
Nestor Chamorro Pesantes 
Jody Hice
Fred L. Lowery
Stephen Olford
Paul Schenck
Shelton Smith
Charles Stanley
Ric Steel
Manuel Sykes
Jerry Vines
Spiros Zodhiates

References

External links
 Official website

Baptist universities and colleges in the United States
Educational institutions established in 1962
Seminaries and theological colleges in Georgia (U.S. state)
Universities and colleges in DeKalb County, Georgia
1962 establishments in Georgia (U.S. state)